Miss Europe 1970 was the 33rd edition of the Miss Europe pageant and the 22nd edition under the Mondial Events Organization. It was held at the Skylistion Theatre in Piraeus, Greece on September 15, 1970. Noelia Alfonso Cabrera of Spain, was crowned Miss Europe 1970 by outgoing titleholder Saša Zajc of Yugoslavia.

Results

Placements

Contestants 

 - Elfriede "Evi" Kurz
 - Francine Martin
 - Jacqueline "Jackie" Francesca Molloy
 - Ursula Rainio
 - Françoise Durand-Behot
 - Vera Kirst
 - Vivi Alexopoulou
 - Stephanie Flatow
 - Kristin Waage
 - Carmel Macken
 - Anna Zamboni
 - Mady Dostert
 - Rita Massard
 - Ana Maria Diozo Lucas
 - Lee Hamilton Marshall
 - Noelia Alfonso Cabrera
 - Diane Jane Roth
 - Asuman Tuğberk
 - Sandra Cater
 - Vicktorija (Viktorija) Ekart

Notes

Withdrawals
Withdrew in protest of the Greek Military Government:

 - Aud Fosse
 - Marie-Louise Nordlund

Other Withdrawals:
 - Withdrew after beauty pageants were banned in Czechoslovakia after Miss Czechoslovakia 1969/1970 Kristina Hanzalová fled to Germany and requested refugee status after the 1970 Miss Universe Contest.

Returns

Debuts

"Comité Officiel et International Miss Europe" Competition

From 1951 to 2002 there was a rival Miss Europe competition organized by the "Comité Officiel et International Miss Europe". This was founded in 1950 by Jean Raibaut in Paris, the headquarters later moved to Marseille. The winners wore different titles like Miss Europe, Miss Europa or Miss Europe International.

This year contest took place in Nice, France in June 1970. The number of delegates is unknown. At the end, Marie Korner (Körner) of Germany was crowned as Miss Europa 1970.

Placements

Contestants

 - Marie Korner (Körner)

References

External links 
 

Miss Europe
1970 beauty pageants
1970 in Greece
1970 in France